Mastalus I (died 953) was the penultimate patricius of Amalfi. He was succeeded by his son, Mastalus II, who was raised to the status of dux. His own father was the last prefect, Manso I.

In 946, he came to the rescue of Gisulf I of Salerno, who was assaulted by an alliance of Landulf II of Benevento and John III of Naples. Mastalus ambushed Landulf's forces in the pass at La Cava.

References
Excerpt from the Chronicon Salernitanum.

953 deaths
10th-century Italian nobility
Year of birth unknown